The 1983–84 Danish 1. division season was the 27th season of ice hockey in Denmark. Eight teams participated in the league, and Herlev IK won the championship.

Regular season

Playoffs
The top four teams from the regular season qualified for the playoffs. Herlev IK defeated AaB Ishockey in the final, and Rungsted IK defeated the Rødovre Mighty Bulls in the 3rd place game.

External links
Season on eliteprospects.com

Dan
1983 in Danish sport
1984 in Danish sport